Michael Tyzack (3 August 1933 – 11 February 2007) was a British painter and printmaker. He is considered an important representative of contemporary abstract painting. He was also known as a jazz musician.

Life and work
Michael Tyzack was born in Sheffield, Yorkshire, and studied from 1952 to 1956 at the Slade School of Fine Art, University College London. Among his most important teachers were William Townsend, Victor Pasmore, Lucian Freud and Sir William Coldstream. Among his fellow students included, among others, Patrick Heron and William Scott.

In 1956 he received a scholarship for a stay in Paris. After his return in 1957 he was active as a jazz musician in addition to his painting.

Tyzack was a member of 56 Group Wales from 1967 to 1972.

Tyzack's painting Alesso 'B''' won the first prize at the 1965 John Moores Painting Prizes in Liverpool.

His work is characterized by its colour-happy Geometric abstraction. In 1968, he was a participant of the fourth 'documenta' in Kassel, with six geometric-abstract paintings.

Since 1955 his work has been exhibited in over 50 group exhibitions in the UK and in France, Switzerland, Netherlands, Italy, Brazil, Australia and Canada. Michael Tyzack was a teacher in the UK and North America and was a professor at the College of Charleston from 1976 to 2007. He died, aged 73, in Johns Island, South Carolina, United States.

 Literature and sources 
 Ausstellungskatalog zur IV. documenta: IV. documenta. Internationale Ausstellung; Katalog: Band 1: (Malerei und Plastik); Band 2: (Graphik/Objekte); Kassel 1968 
 Kimpel, Harald / Stengel, Karin: documenta IV 1968 Internationale Ausstellung – Eine fotografische Rekonstruktion'' (Schriftenreihe des documenta-Archives); Bremen 2007,

References

Links
 Examples of his works

1933 births
2007 deaths
British contemporary painters
British painters
British male painters
British jazz trumpeters
Male trumpeters
Alumni of the Slade School of Fine Art
College of Charleston faculty
Artists from Sheffield
Members of the 56 Group Wales
20th-century British printmakers
20th-century trumpeters
20th-century British male musicians
British male jazz musicians
20th-century British male artists